Blue Öyster Cult (sometimes abbreviated BÖC or BOC) is  an American rock band formed on Long Island in Stony Brook, New York, in 1967. Best known for the singles "(Don't Fear) The Reaper", "Burnin' for You", and "Godzilla", the band has sold 25 million records worldwide, including 7 million in the United States alone. The band's fusion of hard rock and psychedelia with occult, fantastical and often tongue-in-cheek lyrics had a major influence on heavy metal music. Though they have experienced limited and infrequent commercial success, the band has developed a cult following and their most popular songs remain classic rock radio staples.

Blue Öyster Cult's longest-lasting and the most commercially successful lineup included Donald "Buck Dharma" Roeser (lead guitar, vocals), Eric Bloom (lead vocals, "stun guitar", keyboards, synthesizer), Allen Lanier (keyboards, rhythm guitar), Joe Bouchard (bass, vocals, keyboards), and Albert Bouchard (drums, percussion, vocals, miscellaneous instruments). The band's current lineup still includes Bloom and Roeser, in addition to Danny Miranda (bass, backing vocals), Richie Castellano (keyboards, rhythm guitar, backing vocals), and Jules Radino (drums, percussion). The duo of the band's manager Sandy Pearlman and rock critic Richard Meltzer, who also met at Stony Brook University, played a key role in writing many of the band’s lyrics. Blue Öyster Cult‘s music videos, especially "Burnin' for You", received heavy rotation on MTV when the music television network premiered in 1981, cementing the band's contribution to the development and success of the music video in modern popular culture.

History

Early years as Soft White Underbelly (1967–1971)
Blue Öyster Cult was formed in 1967 as Soft White Underbelly (a name the group would occasionally use in the 1970s and 1980s to play small club gigs around the United States and UK) in a communal house at Stony Brook University on Long Island when rock critic Sandy Pearlman overheard a jam session consisting of fellow Stony Brook classmate Donald Roeser and his friends. Pearlman offered to become the band's manager and creative partner, to which the band agreed. The band's original lineup consisted of guitarist Roeser, drummer Albert Bouchard, keyboardist Allen Lanier, singers Jeff Kagel (aka Krishna Das) and Les Braunstein and bassist Andrew Winters.

In October 1967, the band made their debut performance as Steve Noonan's backing band at the Stony Brook University Gymnasium, a gig booked by Pearlman. The band's name came from Winston Churchill's description of Italy as "the soft underbelly of the Axis."

Pearlman was important to the band – he was able to get them gigs and recording contracts with Elektra and Columbia, and he provided them with his poetry for use as lyrics for many of their songs, including "Astronomy". Writer Richard Meltzer, also a Stony Brook University student,  provided the band with lyrics from their early days up through their most recent studio album. In 1968, the band moved in together at their first house in the Thomaston area of Great Neck, New York. The band recorded an album's worth of material for Elektra Records in 1968.

Braunstein played his final show as Soft White Underbelly's lead singer in the spring of 1969. His departure led Elektra to shelve the album recorded with him on vocals.

Eric Bloom was hired by the band as their acoustic engineer and eventually became lead singer, replacing Braunstein, through a series of three unlikely coincidences. One was that Lanier decided to join Bloom on a drive to an upstate gig, where he spent the night with Bloom's old college bandmates and got to hear old tapes of Bloom's talent as lead vocalist. Because of this, Bloom was offered the job of lead singer for Soft White Underbelly.

However, a bad review of a 1969 Fillmore East show caused Pearlman to change the name of the band – first to Oaxaca, then to the Stalk-Forrest Group. Pearlman also gave stage names to each of the band members (Jesse Python for Eric Bloom, Andy Panda for Andy Winters, Prince Omega for Albert Bouchard, La Verne for Allen Lanier) but only Buck Dharma kept his. The band recorded yet another album's worth of material for Elektra, but only one single ("What Is Quicksand?" b/w "Arthur Comics") was released (and only in a promo edition of 300 copies) on Elektra Records (this album was eventually released, with additional outtakes, by Rhino Handmade Records as St. Cecilia: The Elektra Recordings in 2001). The album featured Bloom as their main lead singer, but Roeser also sang lead on a few songs, a pattern of sharing lead vocals that has continued throughout the band's career. Under Bloom, Soft White Underbelly and Stalk-Forrest Group became Stony Brook University house bands which were popular on campus.

After a few more temporary band names, including the Santos Sisters, the band settled on Blue Öyster Cult in 1971 (see below for its origin).

New York City producer/composer and jingle writer David Lucas saw the band perform and took them into his Warehouse Recording Studio and produced four demos, with which Pearlman was able to get the renamed band another audition with Columbia Records. Clive Davis liked what he heard, and signed the band to the label. The first album was subsequently produced and recorded by Lucas on eight-track at Lucas' studio. Winters would leave the band and be replaced by Bouchard's brother, Joe Bouchard.

Black-and-white years (1971–1975)

Their debut album Blue Öyster Cult was released in January 1972, with a black-and-white cover designed by artist Bill Gawlik. The album featured the songs "Cities on Flame with Rock and Roll", "Stairway to the Stars", and "Then Came the Last Days of May". By this time, the band's sound had become more oriented toward hard rock, but songs like "She's As Beautiful As a Foot" and "Redeemed" also showed a strong element of the band's psychedelic roots. Pearlman wanted the group to be the American answer to Black Sabbath. All of the band members except for Allen Lanier sang lead, a pattern that would continue on many subsequent albums, although lead singer Eric Bloom sang the majority of the songs. The album sold well, and Blue Öyster Cult toured with artists such as the Byrds, Mahavishnu Orchestra and Alice Cooper. During the touring process, the band's sound became heavier and more direct.

Their next album Tyranny and Mutation, released in 1973, was written while the band was on tour for their first LP. It contained songs such as "The Red and the Black" (an ode to the Royal Canadian Mounted Police and a rewrite of "I'm on the Lamb But I Ain't No Sheep" from their debut album, and also a reference to the novel of the same name by Stendhal), "Hot Rails to Hell" and "Baby Ice Dog", the first of the band's many collaborations with Patti Smith. It featured a harder-rocking approach than before, although the band's songs were also growing more complex. The album outsold its predecessor, a trend that would continue with their next few albums.

The band's third album, Secret Treaties (1974) received positive reviews, featuring songs such as "Career of Evil" (co-written by Patti Smith), "Dominance and Submission" and "Astronomy". As a result of constant touring, the band was now capable of headlining shows. The album continued their upward sales trend, and would eventually go gold.

As the three albums during this formative period all had black-and-white covers, the period of their career has been dubbed the 'black and white years' by fans and critics.

Commercial success (1975–1981)

The band's first live album On Your Feet or on Your Knees (1975) achieved greater success and went gold. Its success gave the band more time to work on a follow-up. The band members were able to purchase home recording equipment to record demos for their next album.

Their next studio album, Agents of Fortune (1976), was their first to go platinum and was again produced by David Lucas. It contained the hit single "(Don't Fear) The Reaper", which reached number 12 on the Billboard charts and has become a classic of the hard rock genre. Other major songs on the album were "(This Ain't) The Summer of Love", "E.T.I. (Extra-Terrestrial Intelligence)" and "The Revenge of Vera Gemini". Having recorded demos of the songs at home before recording the album, the band's songwriting process had become more individual, with none of the songs featuring the collaborative writing between the band members that had been common on their earlier albums.  Although the album still featured their trademark hard rock with sinister lyrics, the songs had become more conventional in structure, and the production was more polished.  For the first and only time, the album featured lead vocals from all five band members, with Allen Lanier singing lead on the song "True Confessions." With Albert Bouchard singing lead on three songs and Joe Bouchard and Donald Roeser singing lead on one each, Eric Bloom ended up taking the lead on only four of the album's ten songs.

For the tour, the band added lasers to their light show, for which they became known. They were among the first acts to use lasers in performance.

Their next album, Spectres (1977), had the FM radio hit "Godzilla," and would become one of the band's better-selling albums, with other well-known songs like "I Love the Night" and "Goin' Through the Motions". However, its sales were not as strong as those for the previous album, going gold but not platinum, becoming their first album to sell less than its predecessor. It featured even more polished production, and continued the trend of the lead vocals extensively shared between members, although Allen Lanier did not sing lead. As with the previous album, Eric Bloom sang lead on fewer than half the songs.

The band then released another live album, Some Enchanted Evening (1978). Although it was intended as another double-live album in the vein of On Your Feet or on Your Knees, Columbia insisted that it be edited down to single-album length. It was a resounding commercial success, becoming Blue Öyster Cult's most popular album and eventually selling over two million copies. It also revealed that while the band's studio work was becoming increasingly well-produced, they were still very much a hard rock band on stage.

It was followed by the studio album Mirrors (1979). For Mirrors, instead of working with previous producers Sandy Pearlman (who instead went on to manage Black Sabbath) and Murray Krugman, Blue Öyster Cult chose Tom Werman, who had worked with acts such as Cheap Trick and Ted Nugent. It featured the band's glossiest production to date. It also gave Roeser, the lead vocalist on the band's biggest hits, bigger prominence as a vocalist, singing lead on four of the nine songs.  However, the resulting album sales were disappointing.

Pearlman's association with Black Sabbath led to Sabbath's Heaven and Hell producer Martin Birch being hired for the next Blue Öyster Cult record. The album found the band returning to their hard rock roots, and although both of the Bouchard brothers and guitarist Roeser all got lead vocal turns, Bloom would sing the majority of the tracks. The result was positive, with Cultösaurus Erectus (1980) receiving good reviews. The album went to number 12 in the United Kingdom, but did not do as well in the United States. The song "Black Blade", which was written by Bloom with lyrics by science fiction and fantasy author Michael Moorcock, is a kind of retelling of Moorcock's epic Elric of Melniboné saga. The band also did a co-headlining tour with Black Sabbath in support of the album, calling the tour "Black and Blue".

Birch produced the band's next album as well, Fire of Unknown Origin (1981), which peaked at number 24 on the Billboard 200, becoming the band's highest-charting album. The biggest hit on this album was the Top 40 hit "Burnin' for You," a song Roeser had written with a Richard Meltzer lyric. He had intended to use it on his solo album, Flat Out (1982), but he was convinced to use it on the Blue Öyster Cult album instead. The revival of the band's heavier sound continued, albeit with fairly heavy use of synthesizers and some noticeable New Wave influence on a few tracks. It contained other fan favorites such as "Joan Crawford" (inspired by the book and film Mommie Dearest) and "Veteran of the Psychic Wars", another song co-written by Moorcock. Several of the songs had been written for the animated film Heavy Metal, but only "Veteran of the Psychic Wars" (which had not been written for Heavy Metal) was actually used in the movie. The album marked a strong commercial resurgence for the band and achieved gold status, their first studio album since Spectres to do so.

During the tour for Fire of Unknown Origin, Albert Bouchard had a falling out with the others and left the band, and Rick Downey (formerly the band's lighting designer) replaced him on drums. This marked the end of the band's original and best-known lineup.

Decline and fall (1982–1987)
After leaving the band, Albert Bouchard spent five years working on a solo album based on Sandy Pearlman's poem "Imaginos". Blue Öyster Cult also released a third live album Extraterrestrial Live.

The band then went to the studio for the next album, The Revölution by Night (1983), with Bruce Fairbairn as producer. After two albums of a return to a harder rocking sound, the band adopted a more radio-friendly, AOR-oriented sound with Fairbairn providing a 1980s-style production. This approach met with some success, especially on its highest-charting single, Roeser's "Shooting Shark", co-written by Patti Smith and featuring Randy Jackson on bass, which reached number 83 on the charts. Bloom's "Take Me Away" achieved some FM radio play. However, the album didn't match sales of its predecessor, failed to achieve gold status, and marked the beginning of the band's second commercial decline. After touring for Revölution, Rick Downey left, leaving Blue Öyster Cult without a drummer.

Blue Öyster Cult re-united with Albert Bouchard for a California tour in February 1985, infamously known as the 'Albert Returns' Tour. This arrangement was only temporary and caused more tensions between the band and Bouchard, since he had thought he would be staying on permanently, which was not the case. The band had intended to use him only as a fill-in until another drummer could come on board, which resulted in Bouchard's leaving after the tour. Allen Lanier also quit the band shortly thereafter, leaving them without a keyboardist and with only three remaining original members. This incarnation of the band would sometimes be referred to as '3ÖC' by fans, which is a pun on the number of original members left.

Blue Öyster Cult hired drummer Jimmy Wilcox and keyboardist Tommy Zvoncheck to finish the album Club Ninja, which was poorly received, with only "Dancin' in the Ruins," one of several songs on the record written entirely by outside songwriters, enjoying minimal success on radio and MTV. The best-known original on the album is "Perfect Water" written by Dharma and Jim Carroll (noted author of The Basketball Diaries). While the band members have generally been disparaging about the album in retrospect, Joe Bouchard has stated that "Perfect Water" is "perfect genius".

The band toured in Germany, after which bassist Bouchard left, leaving only two members of the classic lineup: Eric Bloom and Donald Roeser. Some people referred to the band as "Two Öyster Cult" during this period. Jon Rogers was hired to replace Joe and this version of the band finished out the 1986 tour. After it wound up that year, the band took a temporary break from recording and touring.  When Blue Öyster Cult received an offer to tour in Greece in the early summer of 1987, the band reformed. Wilcox quit while Zvoncheck was fired for making excessive financial demands. Allen Lanier then was offered to rejoin and agreed, so the new line-up now featured three founding members, along with Jon Rogers returning on bass and Ron Riddle as their newest drummer.

Columbia Records was not interested in releasing the Imaginos project as an Albert Bouchard solo album so it was arranged for the record  to be released in 1988 by Columbia as a Blue Öyster Cult album, with some new lead vocal overdubs from Bloom and Roeser and lead guitar overdubs from Roeser. These replaced most of Albert Bouchard's lead vocals, as well as many lead guitar parts that had been recorded by session musicians. Joe Bouchard and Allen Lanier had earlier contributed some minor keyboard and backing vocal parts to the album, allowing all five original members to be credited. The album didn't sell well (despite a positive review in Rolling Stone magazine) and although the then-current Blue Öyster Cult lineup (minus both Bouchard brothers) toured to promote Imaginos, promotion by the label was virtually non-existent. When Columbia Records' parent company CBS Records was purchased by Sony and became Sony Music Entertainment, Blue Öyster Cult were dropped from the label.

1990s and early 2000s 

The band spent the next 11 years touring without releasing an album of new material, although they did contribute two new songs to the Bad Channels movie soundtrack, released in 1992, and also released an album of re-recorded songs from the band's original lineup, called Cult Classic, in 1994. During these years, while the three original members remained constant, there were several changes in the band's rhythm section. Ron Riddle quit in 1991 and was followed by a series of other drummers including
Chuck Burgi (1991–1992, 1992–1995, 1996–1997), John Miceli (1992, 1995), John O'Reilly (1995–1996) and Bobby Rondinelli (1997–2004). As for the bass position, Rogers left in 1995, and was replaced by Danny Miranda.

In the late 1990s, Blue Öyster Cult secured a recording contract with CMC Records (later purchased by Sanctuary Records), and continued to tour frequently. Two studio albums were released, Heaven Forbid (1998) and Curse of the Hidden Mirror (2001). Both albums featured songs co-written by cyberpunk/horror novelist John Shirley. The first mostly featured Miranda on bass and Burgi on drums, although a few tracks feature earlier bassist Jon Rogers and one track features Rondinelli on drums, who had joined the band near the end of the recording. Curse of the Hidden Mirror features Miranda and Rondinelli as the rhythm section, and the pair contributed to the songwriting as well. Neither album sold well.

Another live record and DVD A Long Day's Night followed in 2002, both drawn from one concert in Chicago. This album also featured the Bloom, Roeser, Lanier, Miranda, Rondinelli lineup.

Although the band's lineup had remained stable from 1997 to 2004, they began to experience personnel changes again in 2004. Rondinelli left in 2004, and was replaced by Jules Radino. Miranda left during the same year to become the bassist for Queen + Paul Rodgers in place of the retired John Deacon. He was replaced by Richie Castellano, who would also take occasional turns as a lead vocalist onstage.

In 2001, Sony/Columbia's reissue arm, Legacy Records issued expanded versions of the first four Blue Öyster Cult studio albums, including some previously unreleased demos and outtakes from album sessions, live recordings (from the Live 72 EP), and post-St. Cecilia tunes from the Stalk-Forrest Group era.

Late 2000s and 2010s 

Allen Lanier retired from live performances in 2007 after not appearing with the band since late 2006. Castellano switched to rhythm guitar and keyboards (Castellano also filled in on lead guitar and vocals for an ailing Buck Dharma in two shows in 2005), and the position of bassist was taken up by Rudy Sarzo (previously a member of Quiet Riot, Whitesnake, Ozzy Osbourne and Dio), with the band employing Danny Miranda and Jon Rogers as guest bassists to fill in when Sarzo was unavailable. Sarzo then joined as an official member of the band, although Rogers continued to occasionally fill in when Sarzo was busy.

In February 2007, the Sony Legacy remaster series continued, releasing expanded versions of studio album Spectres and live album Some Enchanted Evening.

In June 2012, the band announced that bassist Rudy Sarzo was leaving the band and was being replaced by former Utopia bassist Kasim Sulton.

In August of the same year, it was announced that Sony Legacy would be releasing a 17-disc boxed set entitled The Complete Columbia Albums Collection on October 30, 2012. The set includes the first round of the remastered series plus the long-awaited remastered versions of On Your Feet or on Your Knees, Mirrors, Cultösaurus Erectus, Fire Of Unknown Origin, Extraterrestrial Live, The Revölution by Night, Club Ninja and Imaginos. Also exclusive to this set are two discs of rare and unreleased B-sides, demos and radio broadcasts.

Also in 2012, celebrating the 40th anniversary of Blue Öyster Cult, the then-current incarnation of the band reunited for the first time in 25 years with other original members Joe and Albert Bouchard and Allen Lanier as guests for a special event in New York.

Founding keyboardist/guitarist Allen Lanier died of chronic obstructive pulmonary disease on August 14, 2013.

In 2016, Albert Bouchard played again as guest with the current line-up of the band, playing at shows in New York, Los Angeles, Dublin and London, where Blue Öyster Cult played the album Agents of Fortune in its entirety. The shows featured songs from Agents of Fortune that had either not been played live before ("True Confessions", "The Revenge of Vera Gemini", "Sinful Love", "Tenderloin", "Debbie Denise"), songs that had not been played since the album's debut tour ("Morning Final"), and songs that were no longer/never played frequently ("This Ain't the Summer of Love", "Tattoo Vampire"), as well as the fan favorite "Five Guitars", which had not been played since Albert initially left the band in 1981. Albert played in the following songs at the show: "The Revenge of Vera Gemini" (vocals, guitar), "Sinful Love" (vocals, guitar), "Tattoo Vampire" (guitar), "Morning Final" (guitar), "Tenderloin" (cymbals), "Debbie Denise" (vocals, acoustic guitar), "Cities on Flame with Rock and Roll" (vocals, drums), and "Five Guitars" (guitar).

In a May 2017 appearance on Castellano's "Band Geek" podcast, Bloom confirmed that there were tentative plans to release a new album in 2018 and that the band was currently considering offers from multiple record labels. He also stated that former bassist Danny Miranda would be playing with the band for the remainder of the year due to Sulton's prior touring commitments with Todd Rundgren. During the same year, the band's official website started to list Miranda as an official member, stating that Miranda had "returned to BÖC" in early 2017.

Buck Dharma stated in February 2019 that the band would be recording a new album to be released by fall. On July 10, 2019, it was announced that the band had signed to Frontiers Music, and would in fact be releasing the new album in 2020. "It's been a long time since BÖC's last studio album. Recording with Danny, Richie and Jules should be a great experience as we've been touring together for years, and Buck and I look forward to including them in the creative and recording process," said Bloom. "The current band is GREAT and has never been recorded other than live, so we feel now's the time for new songs to be written and recorded. About half of the songs for the new record exist and the rest will be finished during the process," added Buck Dharma. In February 2020, Richie Castellano posted a short video to Facebook featuring himself and Eric Bloom, stating that the band are working on the new Blue Oyster Cult record remotely by using ConnectionOpen online audio collaboration tool.

The Symbol Remains (2020–present) 
In August 2020, the band announced on their website that their fifteenth studio album The Symbol Remains would be released on October 9, 2020. The span of nineteen years between Curse of the Hidden Mirror and The Symbol Remains marks the longest gap between studio albums in Blue Öyster Cult's career. The album was released to a positive critical reception, with tracks such as "Box In My Head" and "The Alchemist" receiving high praise.

In October 2022, during their European headlining tour, Blue Öyster Cult supported Deep Purple at five arena shows in the United Kingdom.

Musical style 
Blue Öyster Cult is a hard rock band, whose music has been described as heavy metal, psychedelic rock, occult rock, biker boogie, acid rock, and progressive rock. They have also been recognized for helping pioneer genres such as stoner metal.  The band has also experimented with additional genres on specific albums. An example of this is Mirrors.

The band is influenced by artists such as Alice Cooper, Grateful Dead, The Doors, Jefferson Airplane, MC5, The Blues Project, Jimi Hendrix, and Black Sabbath.

While Blue Öyster Cult has been noted for heavy rock, they would often add their own tongue-in-cheek style. Keeping with their image, the band would often include out-of-context fragments of Pearlman's The Soft Doctrines of Imaginos into their lyrics, giving their songs cryptic meanings. Additionally, the band would keep a folder of Meltzer's and Pearlman's word associations to insert into their music.

Band name and logo 

The name "Blue Öyster Cult" came from a 1960s poem written by manager Sandy Pearlman. It was part of his "Imaginos" poetry, later used more extensively on their album Imaginos (1988). Pearlman had also come up with the band's earlier name, "Soft White Underbelly", from a phrase used by Winston Churchill in describing Italy during World War II. In Pearlman's poetry, the "Blue Oyster Cult" was a group of aliens who had assembled secretly to guide Earth's history. "Initially, the band was not happy with the name, but settled for it, and went to work preparing to record their first release..."

In a 1976 interview published in the U.K. music magazine ZigZag, Pearlman told the story explaining the origin of the band's name was an anagram of "Cully Stout Beer".

The addition of an umlaut was suggested by Allen Lanier, but Richard Meltzer claims to have suggested it just after Pearlman came up with the name, reportedly "because of the Wagnerian aspect of Metal". Other bands later copied the practice of using umlauts or diacritic marks in their own band names, such as Motörhead, Mötley Crüe, Queensrÿche and parodied by Spın̈al Tap.

The hook-and-cross logo was designed by fellow Stony Brook student Bill Gawlik for his master's thesis in January 1972, and appears on all of the band's albums. In Greek mythology, "... the hook-and-cross symbol is that of Kronos (Cronus), the king of the Titans and father of Zeus ... and is the alchemical symbol for lead (a heavy metal), one of the heaviest of metals." Sandy Pearlman considered this, combined with the heavy and distorted guitar sound of the band and decided the description "heavy metal" would be apt for the band's sound. The hook-and-cross symbol also resembled the astrological symbol for Saturn, the Roman god of agriculture, and the sickle, which is associated with both Kronos (Cronus) and Saturn (both the planet and the Roman god). The logo's "... metaphysical, alchemical and mythological connotations, combined with its similarity to some religious symbols gave it a flair of decadence and mystery ..."

The band was billed, for the only time, as "The Blue Öyster Cult" on the cover and label of their second album, Tyranny and Mutation.

Legacy and influence
Blue Öyster Cult have been influential to the realm of hard rock and heavy metal, leading them to being referred to as "the thinking man's heavy metal band" due to their often cryptic lyrics, literate songwriting, and links to famous authors. They have influenced many acts including Iron Maiden, Metallica, Fates Warning, Iced Earth, Cirith Ungol, Alice in Chains, Twisted Sister, Ratt, Steel Panther, Green River (and later Mudhoney), Body Count, Possessed, Candlemass, Saint Vitus, Trouble, Opeth, White Zombie, Kvelertak, HIM, Turbonegro, Radio Birdman, The Cult, The Minutemen, Firehose, Hoodoo Gurus, Widespread Panic, Queens of the Stone Age, Umphrey's McGee, Stabbing Westward, Royal Trux, and Moe.

The band's influence has extended beyond the musical sphere. The lyrics of "Astronomy" have been named by author Shawn St. Jean as inspirational to the later chapters of his fantasy novel Clotho's Loom, wherein Sandy Pearlman's "Four Winds Bar" provides the setting for a portion of the action. Titles and lines from the band's songs provided structure and narrative for the third book in Robert Galbraith's (a pseudonym for J. K. Rowling), series of Cormoran Strike novels, Career of Evil.

Their hit single "(Don't Fear) The Reaper" was featured in the famous Saturday Night Live sketch "More Cowbell". The original recording was produced at The Record Plant in New York by David Lucas, who sang background vocals with Roeser, and introduced the now-famous cowbell part, which may have been played by himself, Albert Bouchard, or Eric Bloom.

"(Don't Fear) The Reaper" was also used in writer/director John Carpenter's horror film classic, Halloween (1978), the opening sequence of the miniseries adaptation of The Stand (1994) by Stephen King, and covered by The Mutton Birds for Peter Jackson's horror-comedy film The Frighteners (1996). "(Don't Fear) The Reaper" was also used throughout the comedy film The Stoned Age (1994) and plays a role in its storyline. In the film Gone Girl (2014), the song plays on the radio during a car driving scene with actor Ben Affleck.  The song was also used as the opening theme and main story element in the 1996 FMV computer game "Ripper", by Take Two Interactive, and was also featured in the 2021 video game Returnal. The lyrics for "(Don't Fear) The Reaper" are featured in the introduction of Stephen King's book The Stand.

Members

Current members
 Buck Dharma – lead guitar, lead vocals and backing vocals (1967–present)
 Eric Bloom – lead vocals and backing vocals, "stun guitar", keyboards, synthesizers (1969–present)
 Danny Miranda – bass, backing vocals (1995–2004, 2017–present)
 Richie Castellano – keyboards, rhythm guitar, additional lead guitar, backing vocals, additional lead vocals (2007–present), bass (2004–2007)
 Jules Radino – drums, percussion (2004–present)

Lyrics
During their career, Blue Öyster Cult have frequently collaborated with outside lyricists, although in the late 1970s the band members also wrote lyrics for some of their songs. Lyricists for Blue Öyster Cult have included all the original members (Bloom, Roeser, Albert and Joe Bouchard, and Lanier), producer Sandy Pearlman, and writers Richard Meltzer, Patti Smith, Michael Moorcock, Eric Van Lustbader, Jim Carroll, Broadway Blotto and John Shirley.

Discography

Studio albums
 Blue Öyster Cult (1972)
 Tyranny and Mutation (1973)
 Secret Treaties (1974)
 Agents of Fortune (1976)
 Spectres (1977)
 Mirrors (1979)
 Cultösaurus Erectus (1980)
 Fire of Unknown Origin (1981)
 The Revölution by Night (1983)
 Club Ninja (1985)
 Imaginos (1988)
 Cult Classic (1994)
 Heaven Forbid (1998)
 Curse of the Hidden Mirror (2001)
 The Symbol Remains (2020)

Bibliography
 Blue Öyster Cult: Secrets Revealed!, by Martin Popoff, 303 pages (Canada, 2016)
 Blue Öyster Cult: La Carrière du mal, by Mathieu Bollon and Aurélien Lemant, Camion Blanc publishing, 722 pages (France, 2013)
on track... Blue Öyster Cult (every album, every song), by Jacob Holm-Lupo, Sonic Bond Publishing, 158 pages (UK, 2019)

References

External links

 
 
 

 
1967 establishments in New York (state)
Articles which contain graphical timelines
Columbia Records artists
Hard rock musical groups from New York (state)
Heavy metal musical groups from New York (state)
Musical groups established in 1967
Musical groups from Long Island
Musical quintets
Occult rock musical groups
Psychedelic rock music groups from New York (state)